Pithomictus is a genus of longhorn beetles of the subfamily Lamiinae, containing the following species:

 Pithomictus amboinicus Breuning, 1957
 Pithomictus decoratus Pascoe, 1864
 Pithomictus emandibularis Heller, 1924
 Pithomictus papuanus Breuning, 1959

References

Desmiphorini